Ismail Abdallah (born 1933) is an Egyptian gymnast. He competed in the 1960 Summer Olympics.

References

1933 births
Living people
Gymnasts at the 1960 Summer Olympics
Egyptian male artistic gymnasts
Olympic gymnasts of Egypt
Sportspeople from Cairo